Ibiza (officially in Catalan: Eivissa ) is a city and municipality located on the southeast coast of the island of Ibiza  in the Balearic Islands autonomous community.

Overview
Although called Ibiza in English and Spanish, the official name is the Catalan Eivissa (as restored in 1986) and its inhabitants call it the Vila d'Eivissa or simply Vila ("Town"). It is divided into two main parts: the old town, called the Dalt Vila (literally "Upper Town"), located on a little mountain by the sea, and the modern part, called the Eixample ("extension").

The city, which has a population of 49,727 (2018), is the capital and most populous settlement of the island and of the Pine Islands group, which includes Ibiza and Formentera.

Tourism

Nightlife
Ibiza is widely known and visited for its exciting nightlife. Some of the island's most notable nightclubs include Pacha, Amnesia, Space, and Ushuaïa. These four nightclubs are regularly in the top three of DJ Magazine's annual top 100 global clubs' chart.

Sightseeing

Sights include the cathedral of Santa Maria d'Eivissa (14th century), located at the top of the Dalt Vila, and the Punic necropolis of Puig des Molins.

Climate
Ibiza has a hot semi-arid climate (Köppen: BSh), bordering on a hot-summer Mediterranean climate (Csa). The climate of Ibiza is typically warm, sunny and dry, with low variation between highs and lows. Winters are slightly rainy and mild, from November to April normally the whole island turns green for the seasonal rains. Summers are hot and fairly humid, but with very little rainfall. The few rainy days are often accompanied by thunderstorms. Freezes and extreme temperatures are rare due to the influence of the sea. Ibiza has never been above  or under  since temperature records began in 1952.

See also
 List of municipalities in the Balearic Islands
 Ses Feixes Wetlands

References

External links
 
  
 Tourism Excellence Plan
 Consell d'Evissa  Local government
 Eivissa Archaeological Museum 
 Real time marine traffic at Ibiza Port
 Panoramic virtual tour  of Ibiza Town port

Crown of Aragon
Mediterranean port cities and towns in Spain
Towns in Ibiza